Babylon is a station on the Long Island Rail Road in the village of Babylon, New York at Railroad Avenue west of Deer Park Avenue (Suffolk CR 34). It is on the Montauk Branch and is the eastern terminus of the Babylon Branch service. To the west is the junction (Belmont Junction) with the Central Branch, which heads northwest to join the Main Line at Bethpage Interlocking southeast of the Bethpage station. Babylon station is elevated with two island platforms and is wheelchair accessible through elevator access. The electrified portion of the Montauk Branch ends east of the station.

History

Babylon station originally opened as a South Side Railroad of Long Island depot on October 28, 1867. It was briefly renamed Seaside station in the summer of 1868, but resumed its original name of Babylon station in 1869. The Central Railroad of Long Island had once planned an extension to the Great South Bay and Fire Island which was never built, and a horse car and later trolley line was provided by the Babylon Rail Road company as a substitute. The CRRLI abandoned their own depot in 187, and began to share it with SSRLI. From that point on the original SSRLI depot contained the name "Babylon & Fire Island" posted on one side. The second depot opened on July 2, 1881, and contained three tracks with two low-level side platforms and two high island platforms, as well as a pedestrian bridge and a REA Express freight house. Electrification came to the station in May 1925, and the station became the terminus of the newly established Babylon Branch. It was razed in 1963 as part of the grade elimination project that was taking place along the entire Babylon Branch during the post-war era. The new elevated third station opened on September 9, 1964. 

East of the station, a train washing canopy existed in West Islip until 2005. In June 2010, the Long Island Rail Road broke ground on a new environmentally friendly train wash canopy, since Ronkonkoma station had the only train wash on the east end. This new train wash is able to recycle water already used using filters and is capable of washing up to 180 electric multiple unit cars a day.

As budgeted in the 2008–2013 Capital Plan, station rehabilitation over the next five years will include the demolition of the existing platforms and design and construction of a new platform as well as replacement of platform waiting rooms, escalators, and elevators. The project is projected to cost $39 million and will replace infrastructure that has existed since 1964.

Station layout

The station has two 12-car-long high-level island platforms.

References

External links

The Unofficial LIRR History Website
1941 Postcard, 1954 and March 2000 Photos
BABYLON Interlocking (The LIRR Today)
 Station from Google Maps Street View
Platforms from Google Maps Street View
Waiting Room from Google Maps Street View

Long Island Rail Road stations in Suffolk County, New York
Railway stations in the United States opened in 1867
1867 establishments in New York (state)